German submarine U-549 was a Type IXC/40 U-boat of Nazi Germany's Kriegsmarine during World War II. The submarine was laid down on 28 September 1942 at the Deutsche Werft yard in Hamburg, launched on 28 April 1943, and commissioned on 14 July 1943 under the command of Kapitänleutnant Detlev Krankenhagen. After training with the 4th U-boat Flotilla at Stettin, the U-boat was transferred to the 10th U-boat Flotilla for front-line service on 1 January 1944.

Design
German Type IXC/40 submarines were slightly larger than the original Type IXCs. U-549 had a displacement of  when at the surface and  while submerged. She had two shafts and two  propellers.

U-549 was fitted with six  torpedo tubes (four fitted at the bow and two at the stern), 22 torpedoes, one  SK C/32 naval gun, 180 rounds, and a  SK C/30 as well as a  C/30 anti-aircraft gun. The boat had a complement of forty-eight.

Service history

First patrol
U-549 departed Kiel on 11 January 1944, and sailed out into the mid-Atlantic, via the gap between Iceland and the Faroe Islands, but had no success. The U-boat arrived at Lorient in occupied France on 26 March after 76 days at sea.

Second patrol and loss
The U-boat left Lorient on 14 May 1944 and sailed to the waters north-west of the Canary Islands. At 20:13 on 29 May 1944, U-549 slipped through the anti-submarine screen of the hunter-killer group TG 21.11, and fired three T-3 torpedoes at the escort carrier , hitting her with two, and severely damaging the ship which later sank. All 57 hands were lost.

Wolfpacks
U-549 took part in three wolfpacks, namely:
 Igel 1 (3 – 17 February 1944) 
 Hai 1 (17 – 22 February 1944) 
 Preussen (22 February – 22 March 1944)

Summary of raiding history

References

Notes

Citations

Bibliography

External links

1943 ships
World War II submarines of Germany
German Type IX submarines
U-boats commissioned in 1943
World War II shipwrecks in the Atlantic Ocean
U-boats sunk in 1944
U-boats sunk by depth charges
Ships built in Hamburg
U-boats sunk by US warships
Ships lost with all hands
Maritime incidents in May 1944